Edward David Pepitone (born November 5, 1958) is an American character actor, stand-up comedian and podcast host. He is known for his dark comedy style.

Early life
Pepitone was born to a Sicilian father and a Jewish mother in Brooklyn, New York City, and was raised from the age of nine on Staten Island. His father was a history teacher and later the dean of a high school. As a child, he would often make his friends laugh, describing himself as a “classic class clown” and would incorporate the use of word play and non sequiturs. While his mother was supportive of his career choice, his father wanted him to become a doctor. His father, involved with the Teachers Union, gave him a copy of The Rich and the Super Rich by Ferdinand Lundberg. Prior to becoming a comedian, he installed hardwood flooring, which he claims caused tinnitus that affects him today.

Career

Described as a "cult favorite", Pepitone is a staple in the Los Angeles comedy scene. He is known for his regular appearances in the early days of the WTF with Marc Maron podcast and his sketch appearances on Late Night with Conan O'Brien and Conan, often playing his recurring role as the "New York City Heckler" in the audience. He has also had recurring roles on television programs such as The Life & Times of Tim, The Sarah Silverman Program and Nick Swardson's Pretend Time. His short mockumentary film Runyon: Just Above Sunset, co-written by Karen Simmons and directed by Troy Conrad, won Best in Show (as well as Best Actor in a Mockumentary) at the L.A. Mockfest as well as Best Comedy Short at the Burbank Film Festival in 2011. Pepitone often pokes fun at corporatocracy and has been nicknamed the Bitter Buddha.

Pepitone was a first-round contestant during the first season of Last Comic Standing. Throughout the late 1990s and early 2000s, Pepitone was a regular sketch performer on Late Night with Conan O'Brien. He has appeared in films such as The Muppets, Old School, School for Scoundrels, and Terri. Pepitone regularly performs stand-up comedy at the Upright Citizens Brigade Theater in Los Angeles. Pepitone has made many guest appearances on comedy programs, including Bob's Burgers, The King of Queens, Chappelle's Show, Malcolm in the Middle, Monk, Community, Childrens Hospital, The Eric Andre Show, Happy Endings, Flight of the Conchords, 2 Broke Girls, Whitney, and It's Always Sunny in Philadelphia. Pepitone also appears in the 2012 documentary Alone Up There, which looks at the craft of stand-up comedy.

Pepitone's first stand-up album, A Great Stillness, was recorded at the Gotham Comedy Club and released in 2011. He also released a sketch comedy album in 2006 called The Big Push.

From 2011 to 2013, Pepitone starred in the 500 episodes of the web comedy series Puddin'.

In the fall of 2013, Pepitone started hosting his own podcast called Pep Talks after being a member of The Long Shot podcast for several years.

In 2014, he won the September 7 episode of @midnight.

A documentary about Pepitone's career entitled The Bitter Buddha was released in 2012 to positive reviews.

Pepitone appears in the Adult Swim comedy Your Pretty Face is Going to Hell as Eddie, a tortured soul.

His stand-up special For the Masses was released in June 2020. In December 2020, the New York Times called it the funniest special of the year.

Personal life
Pepitone is a vegan, having become vegan after watching animal rights videos. His wife is an animal rights activist.

Pepitone is famously best friends with Matt Oswalt, the younger brother of Patton Oswalt.

Discography

Albums

Videos

Album appearances

Filmography

Film

Television (incomplete list)

References

External links
 
 

1958 births
Living people
American male comedians
American male film actors
American podcasters
American male television actors
American people of Italian descent
People from Brooklyn
People from Staten Island
Male actors from New York City
20th-century American male actors
21st-century American male actors
20th-century American comedians
21st-century American comedians
Tisch School of the Arts alumni
Stand Up! Records artists